Zhu Ting may refer to:

 Zhu Ting (footballer) (朱挺, born 1985), Chinese association football player
 Zhu Ting (volleyball) (朱婷, born 1994), Chinese volleyball player
 Zhu Ting (fictional) (朱亭), a fictional character in the novel series Lu Xiaofeng Series by Gu Long
 Zhuting, Zhuzhou (朱亭), an urban town in Zhuzhou County
 Zhuting town, a township-level division of Jiangxi

See also
 Zhu (disambiguation)
 Ting (disambiguation)